Another Cycle is an album by Jimmy Cliff, released in 1971.

Production
The album was recorded at Muscle Shoals Sound Studio, in Alabama. "Sitting in Limbo" was used on the following year's The Harder They Come. Although recorded in the United States, the album was not released in the country.

Critical reception
The Encyclopedia of Popular Music called the album "short on roots credibility." Wax Poetics wrote that the album "had some excellent material—Cliff’s earnest tenor nicely contrasted by the bluegrass soul of the Swampers—but despite containing classics such as 'Sitting in Limbo' and the title track, the album was widely panned, falling as it did between two camps and perhaps being too far from the Jamaican vibe that had driven Wonderful World."

Track listing
All tracks composed by Guilly Bright and Jimmy Cliff; except where indicated
"Take a Look at Yourself"
"Please Tell me Why"
"The Rap"
"Opportunity Only Knocks Once"
"My Friend's Wife" (Guilly Bright)
"Another Cycle"
"Sitting in Limbo"
"Oh How I Miss You"
"Inside Out, Upside Down"
"Our Thing is Over" (Guilly Bright)

Personnel
 Jimmy Cliff - vocals
 Guilly Bright - arranger, producer
 Roger Hawkins - drums
 David Hood - bass
 Jimmy Johnson - rhythm guitar
 Tippy Armstrong - lead guitar, string synthesizer, acoustic guitar, harmonica
 Barry Beckett - keyboards
 Eddie Hinton - acoustic guitar on "Take a Look at Yourself"
Technical
Larry Henby, Steve Smith, Marlin Green - engineer

References

External links
 Jimmy Cliff website
 Island Records website

1971 albums
Jimmy Cliff albums
Island Records albums